Question the Answers is the fourth studio album by the American ska punk band the Mighty Mighty Bosstones, released on October 4, 1994. "Pictures to Prove It" was released to alternative radio on February 17, 1995.

Track listing
All tracks were written and composed by Dicky Barrett and Joe Gittleman.
 "Kinder Words" – 3:06
 "A Sad Silence" – 3:57
 "Hell of a Hat" – 3:54
 "Pictures to Prove It" – 3:16
 "We Should Talk" – 3:11
 "Dollar and a Dream" – 3:18
 "Stand Off" – 3:22
 "365 Days" – 3:10
 "Toxic Toast" – 3:47
 "Bronzing the Garbage" – 2:27
 "Dogs and Chaplains" – 3:01
 "Jump Through the Hoops" – 4:11

Big Rig 10" Double Vinyl bonus track
 "Pirate Ship" – 3:01

Japan CD bonus tracks
  "Chocolate Pudding" – 3:02 
Previously available as a B-side to the "Kinder Words" single.
 "Patricia (New Version)" – 2:44 
Previously available as a B-side to the "Pictures to Prove It" single.
Original version appears on their debut album, 1989's Devil's Night Out.

Personnel
Dicky Barrett – lead vocals, artwork
Nate Albert – guitar, backing vocals
Joe Gittleman – bass, backing vocals
Joe Sirois – drums
Tim "Johnny Vegas" Burton – saxophone, backing vocals
Kevin Lenear – saxophone
Dennis Brockenborough – trombone
Ben Carr – Bosstone, backing vocals
Brian Dwyer – trumpet
Johnny Goetchius – keyboards, backing vocals
Beth Enloe – backing vocals, assistant engineer
Klotz – director
Ross Humphrey – producer, mixing
Paul Q. Kolderie – producer, engineer, mixing
Joe Nicolo – producer, engineer, mixing
Phil Nicolo – producer, engineer, mixing
David Cook – engineer, mixing
Dan McLaughlin – assistant engineer
Carl Plaster – assistant engineer

Charts

References

1994 albums
The Mighty Mighty Bosstones albums
Albums produced by Paul Q. Kolderie
Mercury Records albums